The Brazilian Journal of Probability and Statistics is a peer-reviewed scientific journal that publishes papers related to statistics. It is published four times a year by the Brazilian Statistical Association with the support of the Institute of Mathematical Statistics. The journal was established in 1987.

Abstracting and indexing 
The Brazilian Journal of Probability and Statistics is indexed in the Current Index to Statistics and Zentralblatt MATH.

Probability journals
Statistics journals
Publications established in 1987
English-language journals
Quarterly journals
Academic journals published by learned and professional societies